Insular Region, meaning a region of islands, can refer to the following:

Insular Chile, otherwise known as the "Insular Region"
Insular Italy, otherwise known as the "Insular Regions"
Insular Region (Colombia)
Insular Region (Equatorial Guinea)
Insular Region (Venezuela)
Insular Southeast Asia
Autonomous Regions of Portugal, otherwise known as "Insular Portugal"
Galápagos Islands, otherwise known as the "Insular Region" of Ecuador

In science:
Insular cortex of the brain

See also
Insular area
Island province
Mainland
Maritime Region
Peninsular